Willinton Federico Techera Acosta (born October 12, 1985 in Montevideo), commonly known as Willington Techera, is a Uruguayan footballer who plays as a defender for Uruguay Montevideo.

Honours
Olimpia
Liga Nacional: 2008-09 Clausura
Peñarol
Primera División Uruguaya: 2009–10

External links
 Profile at soccerway
 Stats at footballdatabase.eu
 Profile at BDFA

1985 births
Living people
Footballers from Montevideo
Uruguayan footballers
Uruguayan expatriate footballers
Association football defenders
Tacuarembó F.C. players
C.D. Olimpia players
Peñarol players
Rampla Juniors players
Centro Atlético Fénix players
Montevideo City Torque players
Deportivo Mictlán players
C.D. Malacateco players
Uruguay Montevideo players
Uruguayan Primera División players
Uruguayan Segunda División players
Liga Nacional de Fútbol de Guatemala players
Uruguayan expatriate sportspeople in Honduras
Uruguayan expatriate sportspeople in Guatemala
Expatriate footballers in Honduras
Expatriate footballers in Guatemala